The United States Air Force's 4397th Air Refueling Wing (Training) was an Air Refueling training unit located at Randolph AFB, Texas. It operated the KC-97 Stratocruisers with an authorization for 40 aircraft.

The wing was assigned to 2d Air Force from 1 July 1958 until 15 June 1962, and supported two assigned Squadrons

  4397th Combat Crew Training Squadron, 1 July 1958 until 15 June 1962
  4397th Consolidated Aircraft Maintenance Squadron, 1 July 1958 until 15 June 1962

It was assigned to the 42d Air Division, 2d Air Force, from 15 July 1959 until 15 June 1962.

External links
 Strategic Air Command.com

Units and formations of Strategic Air Command
Four Digit Wings of the United States Air Force
Air refueling wings of the United States Air Force
Training wings of the United States Air Force